The Pizol is a mountain in the Glarus Alps of northeastern Switzerland, overlooking Wangs in the canton of St. Gallen. At 2,844 metres above sea level, it is the highest summit of the chain separating the valleys of the Seez and the Tamina rivers, and the highest mountain lying entirely within the canton of St. Gallen.

There are five mountain lakes (Pizolseen) on Pizol: Wangsersee at Pizolhütte, Wildsee, Schottensee, Schwarzsee (2368 m) and Baschalvasee (2174 m). A small cirque glacier, the Pizolgletscher, had been located above 2,600 metres on the northern side of the mountain.

On 22 September 2019, a 'funeral' and mourning ceremony was held for the Pizol glacier which had disappeared due to rising temperatures. 
 A similar ceremony had been held in August when the Okjökull glacier in Iceland disappeared.

See also

References

External links

Pizol on Hikr
5-lake classic Pizol

Mountains of the Alps
Mountains of Switzerland
Mountains of the canton of St. Gallen